The Lake Shore was a long-distance passenger train operated by Amtrak between Chicago and New York via Cleveland, Ohio. The Lake Shore'''s route paralleled that of the New York Central's famed Lake Shore Limited. Amtrak introduced the Lake Shore on May 10, 1971, nine days after Amtrak had assumed control of most private-sector passenger train operations in the United States of America. The Lake Shore was the only train to serve Cleveland, which had been the largest city left out of the original system. Amtrak introduced the route on the understanding that Ohio and New York would assume two-thirds of the cost of the train. The initial plan included a Toledo, Ohio—Detroit, Michigan connection (to be supported by the state of Michigan); Amtrak dropped the planned connection because of poor track conditions between the two cities.

The Lake Shore was the last long-haul train to use Cleveland's Union Terminal, with the last departure occurring on December 31, 1971. For the last week of the Lake Shore's runs Amtrak used a temporary platform near the Detroit–Superior Bridge, west of the terminal, to avoid incurring a year's fees ($250,000) for a week's use. Amtrak discontinued the train in January 1972, after New York failed to meet its obligations. Amtrak would later introduce the Lake Shore Limited'' over the same route.

References

External links 
November 14, 1971, Amtrak timetable

Former Amtrak routes
Railway services introduced in 1971
Railway services discontinued in 1972
Former long distance Amtrak routes